National Democratic Movement may refer to:

National Democratic Movement (Bosnia and Herzegovina)
National Democratic Movement (Guatemala)
National Democratic Movement (Jamaica)
National Democratic Movement (Pakistan)

See also 
 National Democratic Party (disambiguation)
 National Democrats (disambiguation)
 National Democracy (disambiguation)